John Sedgwick (born May 5, 1954) is an American author. He has written or co-written 15 books and has published numerous magazine articles. His book subjects have included the Philadelphia Zoo, his family history, Alexander Hamilton's duel with Aaron Burr, railroad companies competing to link up with the western United States, wealthy children, and the Cherokee Nation. He has also written novels.

Early life and education 
Sedgwick was born in 1954, the youngest child of Boston investment advisor R. Minturn Sedgwick, and his wife, Emily Ames Sedgwick (née Lincoln). He grew up in the Boston suburb of Dedham, MA, and earned his high school diploma from Groton School. In 1977, Sedgwick graduated Harvard University  with an A.B. in English. While at Harvard, Sedgwick wrote for the Harvard Crimson.

John Sedgwick is a member of the prominent Sedgwick family. His forebears first landed on America's shores in 1636, and contain in their multitude such historical figures as House Speaker Theodore Sedgwick, novelist Catherine Maria Sedgwick, and sixties cultural icon Edie Sedgwick, among others.

Career 

Sedgwick began his writing career as a senior at Harvard University, when he published two articles: one in Harvard Magazine about Minoan archaeology, and another in Esquire co-written with Anne Fadiman about graffiti in Harvard bathroom stalls. Since then Sedgwick has served as an editor at Newsweek and at Self Care, and has frequently published essays and stories in numerous magazines, including The Atlantic, Vanity Fair, Rolling Stone, Esquire, GQ, and many others. Sedgwick's forthcoming work of literary nonfiction, From the River to the Sea: The Untold Story of the Railroad War That Made the West tells the story of competition between the Rio Grande and Santa Fe railroads as they charted paths across largely undeveloped lands of the Old American West.

Sedgwick is best known for his family memoir, In My Blood: Six Generations of Madness and Desire in an American Family and his co-biography, War of Two: Alexander Hamilton, Aaron Burr and the Duel that Stunned the Nation, which won the Society of Cincinnati Prize and was a finalist for the George Washington Prize. Sedgwick is also known for his biography of two rival Cherokee Chiefs, Blood Moon: An American Epic of War and Splendor in the Cherokee Nation.

Personal life 
Sedgwick first married writer Megan Marshall, with whom he has two adult children. He is now married to Financial Times columnist, CNN analyst, and author Rana Foroohar. He lives in Brooklyn with Foroohar and her two children.

Books 

 Night Vision: Confessions of Gil Lewis, Private Eye (1982)
 Rich Kids: America’s Young Heirs and Heiresses, How They Love and Hate Their Money (1985)
 The Peaceable Kingdom: A Year in the Life of America's Oldest Zoo (1988)
 The Dark House (2001)
 The Education of Mrs. Bemis (2003)
 In My Blood: Six Generations of Madness and Desire in an American Family (2008)
 War of Two: Alexander Hamilton, Aaron Burr, And the Duel That Stunned the Nation (2016)
 Blood Moon: An American Epic of War and Splendor in the Cherokee Nation (2019)
 From the River to the Sea: The Untold Story of the Railroad War That Made the West (2021)

References

External links 
 

1954 births
Living people
American male novelists
20th-century American writers
21st-century American writers
People from Dedham, Massachusetts
Harvard University alumni
Sedgwick family